The Uganda Film Festival Award for Best Actor in a Television Drama is an award presented annually by Uganda Communications Commission (UCC) to a male actor for their outstanding acting in a television drama series in Uganda at the Uganda Film Festival Awards

Winners and nominees
The table shows the winners and nominees for the Best Actor in a Television Drama award.

Multiple wins and nominations

References

Ugandan television awards